Heliandes is an airline based in Medellín, Colombia. It is a passenger and freight charter airline specialising in fixed wing and helicopter operations. Its main base is Olaya Herrera Airport, Medellín.

History
The airline was established in 1998 and started operations in 2004.

Accidents and incidents

Fleet

The Heliandes fleet includes the following aircraft (as of July 2016):

1 Let L-410 UVP-E
3 Mil Mi-17

References 

Airlines of Colombia
Airlines established in 1998
Helicopter airlines
Colombian companies established in 1998